WSPO (1390 AM) is an American radio station serving the Charleston, South Carolina, area. This station is under ownership of the Charleston Radio Group subsidiary of Saga Communications. Its studios are located in Charleston (east of the Cooper River) and the transmitter tower is in Charleston as well (west of the Ashley River).

History
WCSC was the first radio station in Charleston as well as the second oldest in the state of South Carolina. It was started by Fred Jordan and Lewis Burk on May 14, 1930. The station's first studios were in the Francis Marion Hotel.

WCSC increased its power from 1 KW to 5 KW on December 14, 1947.

WCSC was previously a longtime Top 40 formatted station for more than three decades until 1983 when WCSC flipped from Top 40 to adult contemporary in connection with WSSX's CHR launch. WCSC competed against WTMA, and both stations remain as adult contemporary stations throughout much of the 1980s. But in 1989, both of the stations dropped adult contemporary entirely, leaving WXTC-FM the only adult contemporary station in the Charleston area. WCSC on the other hand flipped to an oldies format and became WZKG in 1989 and later WCSE in 1990. Surprisingly after a short stint, WCSE became WXTC-AM and flipped back to its previous adult contemporary format in 1991. However, five years later in 1996, WXTC-AM dropped the format and flipped to sports talk.

During the mid-2000s, WXTC was known as "Heaven 1390" with a gospel format until the end of 2008, when it went to a classic soul format, which it carried until June 2009.  The station adopted the WSPO call letters (previously at 95.9 WMXZ) in June 2009 and flipped back to its previous sports talk format.

Under the previous sports radio format, "Southern Sports Now" with Seth Harp and later hosted by Jonas Mount and Big Ben was the station's local program.  WSPO also featured national host Tim Brando. During the 2010 football season, WSPO aired college games from Westwood One and Sports USA Radio Network, plus NFL games each Sunday and Monday Night Football. WSPO was also the home for the ACC Basketball and NCAA basketball tournaments.

On March 10, 2010, Don Imus replaced Tony D, whose last day was February 26. A few months later, Steve Czaban moved to WJKB in September 2010. On October 22, 2011, WSPO changed its format to regional Mexican, branded as "Ritmo Caliente 99.3" and simulcast with W257BQ, and in 2012, WSPO changed to a tourist information format on its AM signal at 1390. A year later in 2013, WSPO's 99.3 FM signal changed to urban contemporary and was known as "99.3 The Box".

On September 6, 2017, the sale of the station to Saga Communications was completed.

References

External links
 Official Website

SPO
SPO
Radio stations established in 1930
Gospel radio stations in the United States
1930 establishments in South Carolina